Quchayuq (Quechua qucha lake, -yuq a suffix, "the one with a lake (or lakes)", also spelled Khochayoj) is a  mountain in the Bolivian Andes. It is located in the Chuquisaca Department, Oropeza Province, Poroma Municipality, southwest of the village of Poroma.

References 

Mountains of Chuquisaca Department